Christos Tampaxis (born 26 June 1977) is a Greek swimmer.

He has represented Greece at the Paralympic Games on six occasions, in 1996, 2000, 2004, 2008, 2012 and 2016 . His first medals came at the 2004 Games. Competing in the S1 category for athletes with the most severe disabilities, Tampaxis won gold in the 50 metre backstroke, and silver in the 50 m and 100 m freestyle. His gold medal in the backstroke was also a Paralympic record: 1:22.20.

He successfully defended his 50-metre backstroke title at the 2008 Games, winning gold with a lead of more than twenty-one seconds over his countryman Andreas Katsaros, but failing to beat his own record; he swam the race in 1:23.15. The 50 metre backstroke was the only S1 event retained at the Beijing Games; Tampaxis therefore had to compete against S2 athletes (with slightly lesser levels of disability) in the freestyle (50m and 100m). He failed to advance from the heats.

Tampaxis is blind, and has no leg movement.

References

External links
 

1977 births
Living people
Greek male freestyle swimmers
Paralympic swimmers of Greece
Paralympic gold medalists for Greece
Paralympic silver medalists for Greece
Swimmers at the 1996 Summer Paralympics
Swimmers at the 2000 Summer Paralympics
Swimmers at the 2004 Summer Paralympics
Swimmers at the 2008 Summer Paralympics
Swimmers at the 2012 Summer Paralympics
Medalists at the 2004 Summer Paralympics
Medalists at the 2008 Summer Paralympics
Medalists at the 2012 Summer Paralympics
S1-classified Paralympic swimmers
Sportspeople with a vision impairment
World record holders in paralympic swimming
Medalists at the World Para Swimming Championships
Medalists at the World Para Swimming European Championships
Paralympic medalists in swimming
Greek male backstroke swimmers
20th-century Greek people
21st-century Greek people
Greek blind people